Alien Soundtracks is the second studio album by American rock band Chrome. It was released in 1977 by Siren Records.

Background 
Alien Soundtracks was Chrome's first record to feature Helios Creed, who would remain a longtime member of the band.

Reception 

Head Heritage wrote: "'Alien Soundtracks' is where every aspect of Chrome is at its peak: at every speed and every facet as each barrage of electronic space debris, taped dialogue and collaged subterranean fears all get refracted through Damon Edge's hypersensitive and distorted mental lenses that project outwards into a crazy quilt of half-caught meaning that, however disjointed the content (which pitches and tosses at every turn), a unity emerges that remains invigorating and consistent at every turn."

Alternative Press named it one of the 15 best punk albums to have come out in 1977, writing: "If Iggy And The Stooges’ Raw Power was the sound of the Rolling Stones in hell, then Alien Soundtracks was the sound of the Stooges in hell, as a lo-fi sci-fi soundscape. The crude bashing and trash-compactor riffing had an acid-damaged edge, making this record both an avant-punk staple and early industrial-rock statement."

Track listing

Personnel 
 Chrome

 Helios Creed – vocals, bass guitar, guitar
 Damon Edge – drums, Moog synthesizer, production, engineering, art direction
 John Lambdin – guitar, bass guitar, electric violin
 Gary Spain – bass guitar, acoustic and electric violins

 Technical

 Michael Gore – mastering
 Amy James – sleeve photography

References

External links 
 

1977 albums
Chrome (band) albums